In October 1975, Dutch businessman Tiede Herrema (21 April 1921 – 24 April 2020) was kidnapped by the Provisional IRA in Castletroy, near Limerick. This triggered a large police investigation and a two week siege, after which Herrema was released unharmed.

Biography
Tiede Herrema was born in Zuilen (then a municipality, today part of Utrecht) in 1921. During World War II, he was arrested by Nazis because he was in the Dutch resistance, and was sent to a concentration camp in Poland. After being liberated by Soviet forces, he walked 500 km to American lines. In the 1970s, Herrema ran a wire factory, Ferenka, in the city of Limerick, Ireland. At the time, this was the city's biggest employer, with approximately 1,400 workers.

Kidnapping and rescue
On the morning of 3 October 1975, having just left his home in Castletroy near Limerick, Herrema was abducted by Provisional Irish Republican Army members Eddie Gallagher and Marion Coyle. The kidnappers demanded the release of three IRA prisoners, including Rose Dugdale.

After a massive security operation, the kidnappers were eventually traced on 21 October 1975 to a house in Monasterevin, County Kildare. After a further two-week-long siege, Herrema was released, shaken, but unharmed. He left Ireland soon after.

Aftermath
He eventually returned to Ireland to present an episode of Saturday Live in 1987. He and his wife Elizabeth were made honorary Irish citizens in 1975, and he was made a Freeman of the city of Limerick. In 2005, he donated his personal papers to the University of Limerick. Herrema died in April 2020, only two days after his wife's death and less than a week after his 99th birthday.

See also
List of kidnappings
List of solved missing person cases

References

External links 
1975: IRA kidnappers release industrialist — BBC News retrospective
Kidnapped - The Herrema Diaries 2005 Interview with Tiede Herrema from the RTÉ Radio Documentary On One series (RealAudio)

1970s missing person cases
Formerly missing people
History of County Limerick
Kidnappings in the Republic of Ireland
Missing person cases in Ireland
Provisional Irish Republican Army actions